The Chief of Military Personnel (CMP) is the senior Canadian Armed Forces officer responsible for the military's human resource programs.  As a "Level One" organization, the CMP reports directly to the Chief of the Defence Staff.

Responsibilities
As the senior officer responsible for the military's human resources, the CMP is responsible for ensuring the military can deliver "the right person, in the right place, at the right time."  These include:

 Education & Training
 Pay
 Benefits
 Pension
 Health Services
 Casualty Support
 Alternate Dispute Resolution
 Return to Work Program
 Transition Assistance Program (TAP)
 Recovery, Rehabilitation and Reintegration
 Dependent Education
 Member Assistance Program
 Operational Trauma Stress Support Centres
 Programs for Ill, Injured and Deceased
 Chaplain General
 Honours & Recognition
 History & Heritage

References

Canadian Armed Forces